Kara Kohler (born January 20, 1991) is an American female crew rower. She won the bronze medal at the 2012 Summer Olympics in the quadruple sculls event.  She also has a World Championship gold medal in the coxless four and a World Championship bronze in the single sculls.

Career 
Kohler swam through high school and started rowing at University of California, Berkeley. In 2011, she was named a Division I first team All-American.  She was a member of the crew that won the I Eight at the 2013 NCAA Rowing Championships.  Within two years of starting to row, she was part of the United States under-23 team, winning a gold medal in the women's eights at the 2010 U-23 World Championship.

In 2011 Kohler was part of the US team that won the coxless four at the World Championships, alongside Sarah Zelenka, Emily Regan and Sara Hendershot.

2012 saw Kohler, Natalie Dell, Megan Kalmoe and Adrienne Martelli win bronze in the women's quadruple sculls at the Olympic Games.  She was not selected for the 2016 Summer Olympics, and nearly quit rowing.

After switching to the single sculls in 2018, Kohler won the bronze medal at the 2019 World Championships.  That year, she was also named US Rowing's female Rower of the Year.

On February 26, 2021, Kohler won the USA Olympic Trials race for single sculls to qualify for the Tokyo Olympics

References

External links

1991 births
Living people
American female rowers
Rowers at the 2012 Summer Olympics
Rowers at the 2020 Summer Olympics
Olympic bronze medalists for the United States in rowing
Medalists at the 2012 Summer Olympics
World Rowing Championships medalists for the United States
Sportspeople from Walnut Creek, California
21st-century American women